The National Socialist Network (NSN) is an Australian neo-Nazi political organisation allegedly formed from two far-right organisations, the Lads Society and the Antipodean Resistance, in 2020. The organisation, based in Melbourne, claims to be active in all six state capitals and several regional cities. The group has used the protests against COVID-19 policies and other methods, such as media manipulation and attention-grabbing, to recruit new members.

The organisation, whose membership is unknown, is led by Thomas Sewell, former ADF member, Neo-Nazi, and convicted criminal.

The National Socialist Network often collaborates with the European Australian Movement, also led by Sewell.

Activities

2020
 
The group, adhering to its proclaimed methods of gaining attention and membership, has had numerous physical and intentionally provocative incidents. In 2020 a group of NSN members in Melbourne did a Nazi salute with a neo-Nazi flag at Swinburne University. A photo of the salute on their Facebook page read: "NSN would like to thank the student body and faculty for letting us promote National Socialism on campus without opposition. Swinburne for the White man!" A university spokesperson responded: “Swinburne University of Technology abhors the comments, and the symbols depicted in the photograph taken on our campus. The views and ideas of groups such as this run counter to everything our university stands for, and we condemn them in the strongest possible terms.”

2021

2022

2023 
In early January 2023, flyers belonging to the National Socialist Network were found in East Brisbane, Queensland.

On 13 January 2023, a Melbourne Magistrates Court sentenced Thomas Sewell to 150 hours of community service to be completed in 18 months.

On 26 January 2023, members of the NSN held a protest in Coburg, Victoria, where they displayed banners.

On 18 March 2023, approximately 30 members of the NSN, including Thomas Sewell, attended a rally in Melbourne in support of British anti-transgender activist Kellie-Jay Keen-Minshull, who spoke at the rally while visiting the city on her Australian and New Zealand tour. Members of the NSN marched down Spring Street, displayed a banner that read "DESTROY PAEDO FREAKS", performed Nazi salutes on the stairs of Parliament House, and referred to transgender people as paedophiles. A counterprotest in support of transgender rights, attended by many students, transgender activists, and socialists, clashed with the group. While the police, including several mounted officers, attempted to separate the two groups, there were some interactions (many of which were violent), and it was reported that pepper spray was used at least once. The events were condemned by the Labor Party, the Liberal Party and the Greens.

References

2020 establishments in Australia
Organizations established in 2020
Neo-Nazi organizations
Neo-Nazism in Australia
Anti-Asian sentiment in Australia